Dyakov (masculine;) or Dyakova (feminine) is a Slavic masculine surname derived from the occupation of dyak (clerk).

People
Bogomil Dyakov, Bulgarian soccer player
Dumitru Diacov, Moldovan politician of Russian ethnicity
Iliya Dyakov, Bulgarian soccer player
Kostadin Dyakov, Bulgarian soccer player
Svetoslav Dyakov, Bulgarian soccer player
Tanko Dyakov, Bulgarian soccer player
Viktoriya Dyakova (born 1993), Ukrainian archer
Vitali Dyakov, Russian soccer player

Place
Dyakov (rural locality), a rural locality (a khutor) in Maykopsky District of the Republic of Adygea, Russia